Roy Archibald Young (May 17, 1882 – December 31, 1960) was an American banker who served as the 4th chairman of the Federal Reserve from 1927 to 1930.  During his tenure as chairman, the Wall Street Crash of 1929 occurred, which signaled the beginning of the Great Depression. Before and after his term at the Federal Reserve Board, Young also served as the president of the Federal Reserve Bank of Minneapolis from 1919 to 1927 and Federal Reserve Bank of Boston from 1930 to 1942.

Early life
Roy A. Young was born on May 17, 1882 to James Wilson Young a miller and millwright from Ontario, Canada and Julia Healy an Irish immigrant in Marquette, Michigan. Young was a messenger for a bank at the age of eight. He then worked as assistant cashier and joined the Citizens National Bank as vice president in 1913.

Career 

From 1919 to 1927 he was president of the Federal Reserve Bank of Minneapolis before becoming chairman of the Federal Reserve Board. From 1930 to 1942 he served as president of the Federal Reserve Bank of Boston. After his resignation, he changed to become chairman of the Merchants National Bank and later chairman of American Woolen Company.

During his term in office as chairman of the Federal Reserve Board there was confrontation between the Federal Reserve Board and the Federal Reserve Bank of New York under George L. Harrison of how to curb speculation that led inter alia to the stock market boom of the late 1920s. The Board was in favor of putting "direct pressure" on the lending member banks while the Federal Reserve Bank of New York wanted to raise the discount rate.

The Board under Young disapproved this step, however Young himself was not fully convinced that the policy of using pressure would work and refused to sign the 1929 Annual Report of the Board because it contained parts favorable to this policy.

Death 
He died on December 31, 1960, in Chestnut Hill, Massachusetts.

References

Further reading

External links 
Statements and Speeches of Roy A. Young

1882 births
1960 deaths
American Woolen Company
Chairs of the Federal Reserve
Coolidge administration personnel
Federal Reserve Bank of Boston presidents
Federal Reserve Bank of Minneapolis presidents
Hoover administration personnel